Lonazolac is a nonsteroidal anti-inflammatory drug (NSAID).

References

Pyrazoles
Nonsteroidal anti-inflammatory drugs
Chloroarenes